Masters of the Universe: Super Adventure, also known as Masters of the Universe in Terraquake, is an interactive fiction video game developed by Adventure Soft and published by U.S. Gold in 1986. The game is part of the Masters of the Universe media franchise. The game was adapted for the BBC Micro, Commodore 64, and ZX Spectrum home computers.

References

External links
 
 Masters of the Universe: Super Adventure at MobyGames
 

1980s interactive fiction
1986 video games
Adventure Soft games
BBC Micro and Acorn Electron games
Commodore 64 games
Interactive fiction based on works
Masters of the Universe video games
Single-player video games
U.S. Gold games
Video games developed in the United Kingdom
Video games set on fictional planets
ZX Spectrum games